Aristotelia triclasma is a moth of the family Gelechiidae. It was described by Alexey Diakonoff in 1954. It is found in New Guinea.

References

Moths described in 1954
Aristotelia (moth)
Moths of New Guinea